Elections to the National Assembly of France were held in Algeria on 22 September 1889.

Results

First constituency

Second constituency

See also
 1889 French legislative election

References

Elections in Algeria
1889
1889 in Algeria
1889 elections in Africa